The 1988 Trans America Athletic Conference men's basketball tournament (now known as the ASUN men's basketball tournament) was held March 10–12 at Ocean Center in Daytona Beach, Florida.

Texas–San Antonio upset top-seeded  in the championship game, 76–69, to win their first TAAC/Atlantic Sun men's basketball tournament. The Roadrunners, therefore, received an automatic bid to the 1988 NCAA tournament, their first Division I tournament appearance.

For the second straight year, only the top eight teams in the conference standings were invited to the tournament.

Bracket

References

ASUN men's basketball tournament
Tournament
TAAC men's basketball tournament
TAAC men's basketball tournament